Diana Krall is a Canadian singer-songwriter and pianist. This is list of awards and nominations for Diana and Works. Overall, Krall has won 24 awards from 50 nominations.

Billboard Japan Music Awards

!Ref.
|-
| 2015
| Wallflower
| Jazz Album of the Year
| 
|

Canadian Smooth Jazz Awards

|-
|rowspan="3"|2005
|Diana Krall
|Female Vocalist of the Year
|
|-
|"Narrow Daylight"
|Songwriter of the Year
|
|-
|The Girl in the Other Room
|Album of the Year
|

Echo Awards
The ECHO Awards are an annual music award ceremony. Winners are determined by the previous year's sales. Krall three nominations.

|-
|rowspan="1"|2006
|Christmas Songs
|rowspan="3"|National/International Jazz Production of the Year
|
|-
|rowspan="1"|2007
|From This Moment On
|
|-
|rowspan="1"|2008
|The Very Best of Diana Krall
|

Grammy Awards
The Grammy Awards are awarded annually by the National Academy of Recording Arts and Sciences. Krall has won two awards from nine nominations.

|-
|rowspan="1"|1996
|All for You: A Dedication to the Nat King Cole Trio
|Best Jazz Vocal Album
|
|-
|rowspan="1"|1997
|Love Scenes
|Best Jazz Vocal Album
|
|-
|rowspan="2"|2000
|rowspan="2"|When I Look in Your Eyes
|Album of the Year
|
|-
|Best Jazz Vocal Album
|
|-
|rowspan="1"|2002
|rowspan="1"|"Better Than Anything" with Natalie Cole
|Best Pop Collaboration with Vocals
|
|-
|rowspan="1"|2003
|rowspan="1"|Live in Paris
|Best Jazz Vocal Album
|
|-
|rowspan="1"|2007
|rowspan="1"|From This Moment On
|Best Jazz Vocal Album
|
|-
|rowspan="2"|2019
|rowspan="1"|Love Is Here to Stay with Tony Bennett
|Best Traditional Pop Vocal Album 
|
|-
|rowspan="1"|"'S Wonderful" with Tony Bennett
|Best Pop Duo/Group Performance 
|

Juno Awards
The Juno Awards is a Canadian awards ceremony presented annually by the Canadian Academy of Recording Arts and Sciences. Krall has received eight awards and twenty one nominations.

|-
|rowspan="1"|1998
|Love Scenes
|rowspan="1"|Best Mainstream Jazz Album
|
|-
|rowspan="1"|2000
|When I Look In Your Eyes
|Best Vocal Jazz Album
|
|-
|rowspan="3"|2002
|Diana Krall
|Best Artist
|
|-
|rowspan="2"|The Look of Love
|Best Vocal Jazz Album
|
|-
|Best Album
|
|-
|rowspan="2"|2003
|Diana Krall
|Fan Choice
|
|-
|Live in Paris
|Vocal Jazz Album of the Year
|
|-
|rowspan="4"|2005
|rowspan="2"|Diana Krall
|Artist of the Year
|
|-
|Fan Choice
|
|-
|rowspan="2"|The Girl in the Other Room
|Album of the Year
|
|-
|Vocal Jazz Album of the Year
|
|-
|rowspan="5"|2006
|rowspan="2"|Diana Krall
|Artist of the Year
|
|-
|Fan Choice
|
|-
|rowspan="2"|Christmas Songs
|Album of the Year
|
|-
|Vocal Jazz Album of the Year
|
|-
|Live At The Montréal Jazz Festival
|Music DVD of the Year
|
|-
|rowspan="2"|2007
|Diana Krall
|Artist of the Year
|
|-
|rowspan="1"|From This Moment On
|Vocal Jazz Album of the Year
|
|-
|rowspan="3"|2010
|Diana Krall
|Artist of the Year
|
|-
|rowspan="2"|Quiet Nights
|Album of the Year
|
|-
|Vocal Jazz Album of the Year
|

MOBO Awards
The MOBO Awards (an acronym for Music of Black Origin) were established in 1996 by Kanya King. They are held annually in the United Kingdom to recognize artists of any race or nationality performing music of black origin. Krall has one nominated.

|-
|rowspan="1"|2009
|Diana Krall
|rowspan="1"|Best Jazz Act
|

National Jazz Awards
The National Jazz Awards, presented by Galaxie, CBC's Continuous Music Network, Slaight Communications and generously supported by FACTOR, has confirmed that the hosts of this year's National Jazz Awards are Tim Tamashiro, an artist in his own right and weekend host of CBC Radio's Tonic and Karen Gordon, a modern-day renaissance woman – in demand as writer, radio host, film reviewer and media trainer but probably first and foremost a music lover.

|-
|rowspan="1"|2004
|rowspan="3"|Diana Krall
|rowspan="2"|International Musician of the Year
|
|-
|rowspan="2"|2007
|
|-
|Female Vocalist of the Year
|

National Smooth Jazz Awards
The Oasis Contemporary Jazz Awards (Oasis Music Awards) are presented annually to recognize achievement in the Smooth Jazz Music format as well as Jazz Fusion and other sectors of the Contemporary Jazz genre. The award categories are similar in nature to the Grammys, American Music Awards, Country Music Association Awards, etc. Awards are given for Song of the Year, CD of the Year, Male and Female Artist of the Year, etc. Also, an award is presented to the player of the year on sax, piano, drums, bass, guitar, etc.

|-
|rowspan="3"|2003
|rowspan="2"|Diana Krall
|Vocalist of the Year
|
|-
|Female Artist of the Year
|
|-
|"The Look of Love"
|Vocal Song of the Year
|

SOCAN Awards
The SOCAN (the Society of Composers, Authors and Music Publishers of Canada) is the Canadian copyright collective for the right to communicate to the public and publicly perform musical works. SOCAN administers these rights on behalf of its members (composers, lyricists, songwriters, and their publishers) and those of affiliated international organizations by licensing the use of their music in Canada.

|-
|rowspan="1"|2005
|rowspan="1"|Diana Krall
|Hagood Hardy Jazz Music Award
|

Soul Train Lady of Soul Award
The Soul Train Lady of Soul Awards is an awards show that honors the accomplishments of women in the music industry. Krall one nomination.

|-
|rowspan="1"|1998
|rowspan="1"|All For You (A Dedication to the Nat King Cole Trio)
|Best Jazz Album
|

Western Canadian Music Awards
The Western Canadian Music Awards (WCMAs) is an annual awards ceremony for music in the western portion of Canada, that originated in its current form in 2003.

|-
|rowspan="3"|2005
|rowspan="2"|The Girl in the Other Room
|Outstanding Album (Major Label)
|
|-
|Outstanding Jazz Recording
|
|-
|rowspan="1"|Diana Krall
|Entertainer of the Year
|

References

Awards
Krall, Diana